This is a list of 369 species in the genus Melanoplus.

Melanoplus species

References